Line 1 (Officially: Millennium Underground Railway, Metro 1 or M1) is the oldest line of the Budapest Metro, it was built from 1894 to 1896. It is known locally as "the small underground" ("a kisföldalatti"), while the M2, M3 and M4 are called "metró". It is the first underground on the European mainland, and the world's third oldest underground after the London Underground and Liverpool's Mersey Railway.

Line 1 runs northeast from the city center on the Pest side under Andrássy út to the Városliget, or City Park. Like Line 3, it does not serve Buda. Its daily ridership is estimated at 80,000.

History
Line 1 is the oldest of the metro lines in Budapest, having been in constant operation since 1896. The line was inaugurated on May 2, 1896, the year of the millennium (the thousandth anniversary of the arrival of the Magyars), by emperor Franz Joseph. The original name of the operator company was "Franz Joseph Underground Electric Railway Company".

The original purpose of the first metro line was to facilitate transport to the Budapest City Park along the elegant Andrássy Avenue without building surface transport affecting the streetscape. The National Assembly accepted the metro plan in 1870, and the local Hungarian subsidiary company of the Siemens & Halske AG was commissioned for the construction, starting in 1894. It took 2,000 workers using up-to-date machinery less than two years to complete. This section was built entirely from the surface (with the cut-and-cover method). One original car is preserved at the Seashore Trolley Museum in Kennebunkport, Maine, United States.

The line ran underneath Andrássy Avenue, from Vörösmarty Square (the centre) to City Park, in a northeast-southwest direction. The original terminus was the Zoo (with extension to Mexikói út in 1973). It had eleven stations, nine underground and two (Állatkert and Artézi fürdő) overground. It was able to carry as many as 35,000 people a day (today 103,000 people travel on it on a workday).

Reconstruction

1973 
Between 1970 and 1973 the line underwent an extension and reconstruction of some sections. Deák tér station was relocated to connect with the M2 line with the old station becoming the Underground Museum. The rolling stock was changed to Ganz MFAV multiple units which still operate on the line. Finally the line’s left-hand traffic was changed into right-hand traffic.

The major change to the line was the extension to Mexikói út, the closure of Állatkert and the conversion of Széchenyi fürdő to an underground station.

1896: Gizella tér (today Vörösmarty tér) - Artézi fürdő (today Széchenyi fürdő)
1973: Széchenyi fürdő - Mexikói út

1995 
The renovations carried out over the past hundred years have not affected the tunnel section under Andrássy út. As a result, the tunnel - the masonry, the load-bearing steel structures, the insulation against water, the railway track structure, the architecture of the stations - changed little or not at all. From the middle of the 1980s, the serious damage and wear and tear that foreshadowed the necessity and urgency of reconstruction could already be detected.

The ceremonial handover took place in the presence of Mayor Gábor Demszky on September 15 in 1995 as part of an interesting cultural program. What was novel about it was that the audience sat in chairs at the stations, and the production was provided by the artists who got off the trains arriving at the station. Finally, on September 18, passengers were able to take possession of the renewed and beautified small underground. We builders hope it will be used at least as carefully as we built it; then it will continue to serve the traveling public for the next hundred years.

Rolling stock
1896 - 1973: Hungarian subsidiary of Siemens and Halske
1973 - present: Ganz MFAV

Stations and connections

Gallery

See also
 Tremont Street subway, Boston's first underground railway tunnel and the first one built worldwide, after Budapest's Line 1.

References

Budapest Metro lines
Railway lines opened in 1896
World Heritage Sites in Hungary
Industrial archaeological sites in Hungary